David Mark Feldshuh (born 1944 in New York City) is an American physician, playwright, and author. His 1992 play Miss Evers' Boys, based on the Tuskegee syphilis experiment, was a finalist for the 1992 Pulitzer Prize for Drama. The 1997 adaptation of Miss Evers' Boys (adapted by Walter Bernstein) was nominated for 11 Emmy Awards (winning four) and two Golden Globe Awards (winning one).

Feldshuh's work also includes the 1994 documentary Susceptible to Kindness, which won a CINE Golden Eagle Award and an Intercom Gold Plaque.

Feldshuh practices medicine at Cayuga Medical Center and teaches in Cornell University's Department of Performing and Media Arts.

Personal life
Feldshuh was born to a Jewish family in New York City, the son of Lillian (née Kaplan) and Sidney Feldshuh, who was a lawyer. He married Martha A. Frommelt in 1986. He is the brother of actress Tovah Feldshuh, and father of X Ambassadors former guitarist Noah Feldshuh.

References

External links 
 
 
 

1944 births
Living people
Physicians from New York (state)
20th-century American dramatists and playwrights
Cornell University faculty
People from Scarsdale, New York
Scarsdale High School alumni
Jewish American dramatists and playwrights